Myriam Warner-Vieyra (25 March 1939 – 29 December 2017) was a Guadeloupean-born writer of novels and poetry.

Biography
The daughter of Caribbean parents, she was born Myriam Warner in Pointe-à-Pitre, Guadeloupe. She completed secondary school in Europe and moved to Dakar in Senegal. She earned a diploma in library science at Cheikh Anta Diop University and worked for several years as a librarian. In 1961, she married the film director Paulin Soumanou Vieyra.

Several of her poems were published in the literary magazine Présence Africaine in 1976. Her first novel, written in 1980, was Le Quimboiseur l'avait dit (the 1983 English translation published by Longman was entitled As The Sorcerer Said), which is set in the Caribbean. Her second novel Juletane, published in 1982, is the story of a Caribbean woman who married a Senegalese man who, she discovers, is already married. This was followed by a collection of stories, Femmes échouées (Fallen women), in 1988.

Warner-Vieyra died aged 78 on 29 December 2017 in Tours, Indre-et-Loire, France.

Bibliography
 Le Quimboiseur l’avait dit…, Paris/Dakar: Présence Africaine, 1980. English translation by Dorothy S. Blair, As the Sorcerer Said, Harlow, Essex, UK: Longman, 1982. Extract in Daughters of Africa, edited by Margaret Busby, 1992, pp. 621–30.
 Juletane, Paris/Dakar: Présence Africaine, 1982. English translation by Betty Wilson, Juletane, Oxford / Portsmouth, N.H.: Heinemann, 1987.
 Femmes échouées. Paris/Dakar: Présence Africaine, 1988.

Further reading
 Ezeigbo, Theodora Akachi, "Women's Empowerment and National Integration: Ba's So Long a Letter and Warner-Vieyra's Juletane", in Ernest N. Emenyonu and Charles E. Nnolim (eds), Current Trends in Literature and Language Studies in West Africa. Ibadan: Kraft Books Limited, 1994: 7–19.
 Midihouan, Thecla, "Des Antilles à l'Afrique: Myriam Warner-Vieyra", Notre Librairie 74 (1984): 39–53.
 Mortimer, Mildred, "An Interview with Myriam Warner-Vieyra", Callaloo 16.1 (1993): 108–15.
 Mortimer, Mildred, "The Female Quester in Myriam Warner-Vieyra's Le Quimboiseur l’avait dit and Juletane", College Literature 22 (February 1995): 37–50.
 Ngate, Jonathan, "Reading Warner-Vieyra's Juletane", Callaloo 9.4 (1986): 553–64.
 Pfaff, Françoise, "Conversations with Myriam Warner-Vieyra", College Language Association Journal 39 (September 1995): 26–48.
 Rogers, Juliette M., "Reading, Writing, and Recovering: Creating a Women's Creole Identity in Myriam Warner-Vieyra's Juletane", The French Review 69.4 (March 1996): 595–604.
 Sol, Antoinette Marie, "Histoire(s) et traumatisme(s): l'infanticide dans le roman féminin antillais", The French Review 81.5 (April 2008): 967–84.

References 

1939 births
2017 deaths
20th-century French women writers
20th-century novelists
20th-century poets
Guadeloupean novelists
Guadeloupean poets
Guadeloupean women poets
Guadeloupean women writers
People from Pointe-à-Pitre
Senegalese novelists
Senegalese poets
Senegalese women poets
Senegalese women writers